Cuttin' Grass, Vol. 2: The Cowboy Arms Sessions is the sixth album by American country musician Sturgill Simpson, and a follow-up to Cuttin' Grass, Vol. 1: The Butcher Shoppe Sessions. It was released on December 10, 2020, through Simpson's own label, High Top Mountain. The album consists of bluegrass renditions of songs from elsewhere in his catalog.

Content
As with the preceding volume, the album features various bluegrass musicians such as guitarists Tim O'Brien and Mark Howard, banjoist Scott Vestal, fiddler Stuart Duncan, and mandolinist/backing vocalist Sierra Hull. The album consists mainly of bluegrass re-recordings of previously released songs in Simpson's catalog. Two previously unheard compositions, “Tennessee” and “Hobo Cartoon,” are included; the latter is co-written by Merle Haggard.

Sturgill’s grandfather, Ora Simpson, who he credits for introducing him to Bluegrass music is listed as executive producer.

Track listing
All songs written by Sturgill Simpson; “Hobo Cartoon” co-written by Merle Haggard.
"Call to Arms" – 3:02
"Brace for Impact (Live a Little)" – 4:18
"Oh Sarah" – 3:05
"Sea Stories" – 3:11
"Hero" – 3:04
"Welcome to Earth (Pollywog)" – 4:41
"Jesus Boogie" – 3:31
"Keep It Between the Lines" – 3:08
"You Can Have the Crown" – 3:06
"Tennessee" – 3:14
"Some Days" – 2:53
"Hobo Cartoon" – 2:32

Personnel
Musicians
 Mike Bub – upright bass
 Stuart Duncan – fiddle, background vocals
 Mark Howard – background vocals, lead guitar, rhythm guitar
 Sierra Hull – mandolin, background vocals
 Miles Miller – percussion, background vocals
 Tim O'Brien – background vocals, lead guitar, rhythm guitar
 Sturgill Simpson – vocals, rhythm guitar
 Scott Vestal – banjo, background vocals

Technical
 Richard Dodd – mastering
 David Ferguson – producer
 Sturgill Simpson – producer
 Ora Simpson – executive producer
 Sean Sullivan – engineer, recording

Charts

Weekly charts

Year-end charts

References

2020 albums
Thirty Tigers albums
Sturgill Simpson albums